Wibbel the Tailor (German:Schneider Wibbel) may refer to:

 Wibbel the Tailor (play), a 1913 play by Hans Müller-Schlösser
 Wibbel the Tailor (opera), a 1938 work by Mark Lothar
 Wibbel the Tailor (1920 film), a German silent film directed by Manfred Noa
 Wibbel the Tailor (1931 film), a German film directed by Paul Henckels 
 Wibbel the Tailor (1939 film), a German film directed by Viktor de Kowa